Werner Roth (January 27, 1921 – June 1973) was an American comic book artist, perhaps best known for immediately succeeding Jack Kirby on Marvel Comics' The X-Men.

Roth's work began appearing in Marvel Comics, then known as Atlas Comics, in 1953. Atlas editor Stan Lee has described being impressed with Roth's portfolio, particularly his drawings of women, "So I took his samples to show [then-publisher] Martin Goodman. I suggested we should use Werner, even create a comic for him. Which we did, and that was how Lorna, the Jungle Girl was born."  Roth drew the first dozen issues of Lorna. He drew a number of other features for Atlas, including most of the stories of the Apache Kid. He later drew romance stories for DC Comics.

Roth returned to Marvel to work on the X-Men in 1966, initially using the pseudonym Jay Gavin, taken from the names of his two sons, to conceal his Marvel work from his editors at DC. His true name was revealed in the "Bullpen Bulletins" page of Fantastic Four #54.  X-Men series writer Roy Thomas later commented that Roth, though a talented artist, was a poor fit for the X-Men, being more oriented towards character interactions and relationships than action.

Roth later drew more Western comics for Marvel, and penciled issues of Superman's Girl Friend, Lois Lane for DC Comics.

References

External links
 
Werner Roth on marvel.com

1921 births
1973 deaths
American comics artists
Marvel Comics people